The canton of Aix-Villemaur-Pâlis (before 2021: Aix-en-Othe) is an administrative division of the Aube department, northeastern France. Its borders were modified at the French canton reorganisation which came into effect in March 2015. Its seat is in Aix-Villemaur-Palis.

It consists of the following communes:
 
Aix-Villemaur-Palis
Auxon
Bercenay-en-Othe
Bérulle
Bucey-en-Othe
Chamoy
Chennegy
Chessy-les-Prés
Coursan-en-Othe
Courtaoult
Les Croûtes
Davrey
Eaux-Puiseaux
Ervy-le-Châtel
Estissac
Fontvannes
Maraye-en-Othe
Marolles-sous-Lignières
Messon
Montfey
Montigny-les-Monts
Neuville-sur-Vanne
Nogent-en-Othe
Paisy-Cosdon
Planty
Prugny
Racines
Rigny-le-Ferron
Saint-Benoist-sur-Vanne
Saint-Mards-en-Othe
Saint-Phal
Vauchassis
Villemoiron-en-Othe
Villeneuve-au-Chemin
Vosnon
Vulaines

References

Cantons of Aube